William Bathurst may refer to:

William Bathurst, 5th Earl Bathurst (1791–1878), British politician
William Hiley Bathurst (1796–1877), British clergyman